The Bolivian Air Force Museum is an aviation museum located at El Alto International Airport in El Alto, La Paz.

History 
In 1958, Amalia Villa de la Tapia began acquiring artifacts related to the history of aviation in Bolivia and these formed the genesis of the Bolivian Air Force's Historical Collection. The historian Ramiro Molina Alanes took over her role as curator of the collection in 1985. Starting in 2001 it was housed in the air force headquarters.

However, the museum was moved to a new location at El Alto International Airport in 2015.

Collection 

 Aérospatiale Alouette III
 Aerotec T-23 Uirapuru
 BAe 146-200
 Beechcraft VT-34A Mentor
 Bell UH-1H Iroquois
 Cessna 152
 Cessna U206G Caravan
 Convair 580
 Douglas C-47 Dakota
 Fokker F27-400M Troopship
 Helibras HB 315B Gaviao
 IAI 201 Arava
 Lancair 360
 Lockheed C-130A Hercules
 Lockheed L-188A Electra
 Lockheed T-33A
 Neiva T-25 Universal
 North American T-6D Texan
 North American T-28A Trojan
 Pilatus PC-7
 Rockwell 690 Turbo Commander
 Stearman PT-17 Kaydet

See also
List of aerospace museums

References

External links 

 
 Fuerza Aérea Boliviana: Museo Aeroespacial

Air force museums
Aviation in Bolivia
Museums in Bolivia
Museums established in 2015
Military and war museums
Aerospace museums